The University of Perpetual Help System is a network of two universities consisting of nine campuses in the Philippines.

History
Established in 1968 by Dr. Jose de Guzman Tamayo and his wife Dra. Josefina Laperal Tamayo as Perpetual Help Hospital and College of Nursing, this institution has been training nurses, doctors, maritime, accountants, hrm, allied health, lawyers, engineers and many other professionals for service in the Philippines and abroad. Now known as UPHS Jonelta (Jose and Nena Laperal Tamayo), the University of Perpetual Help System Jonelta has campuses in Manila, Binan, GMA Cavite, Isabela, and Malasiqui, Pangasinan.

Over the years, under the leadership of Dr./Br.Gen. Antonio L. Tamayo, this institution has developed into a university offering a wide variety of programs mentioned above, but its allied health programs including nursing is the university's core.

The University of Perpetual Help System DALTA (UPHSD) founded on February 5, 1975 by Dr. Daisy Moran Tamayo and Br. Gen. Antonio L. Tamayo, is a highly recognized university in the Philippines. It has 3 major campuses in Las Piñas, Molino, and Calamba. Commission on Higher Education (CHED), Philippines granted deregulated status (equivalent to Autonomous Status) to University of Perpetual Help System DALTA, Manila, Philippines.

Over the past four decades, UPHS has opened nine campuses nationwide including the University of Perpetual Help System DALTA (DALTA System with its main branch in Las Piñas) and the University of Perpetual Help System Laguna (JONELTA System with its main branch in Binan, Laguna).

The Nine UPH Campuses 

The University of Perpetual Help System composed of two constituent universities namely; DALTA Foundation and JONELTA Foundation.

The DALTA System 

University of Perpetual Help System DALTA – Las Piñas (Main Campus)
University of Perpetual Help System DALTA – Molino Campus
University of Perpetual Help System DALTA – Calamba Campus

The JONELTA System 

University of Perpetual Help System JONELTA – Biñan (Main Campus)
University of Perpetual Help System JONELTA – Manila Campus
University of Perpetual Help System JONELTA – GMA Campus
University of Perpetual Help System JONELTA – Pangasinan Campus
University of Perpetual Help System JONELTA – Isabela Campus
 University of Perpetual Help System - Pueblo de Panay Campus

References

External links
 

 
Private universities and colleges in the Philippines
1968 establishments in the Philippines